Lameka Fox is an American fashion model from Maryland.

Biography
In May 2015, she was signed by IMG Models after being scouted through their We Love Your Genes (#WLYG) campaign which scouted girls globally via Instagram.

Fox made her debut as a model on the runway during Paris, London, Milan and New York fashion weeks, opening the Yeezy SS/17 show at New York Fashion Week. Fox has walked the runway for designer including Maison Valentino, Tommy Hilfiger, Marc Jacobs, Rodarte, Kenzo, Miu Miu, Coach, Burberry, Stella McCartney, and Julien Macdonald.

She also starred in a Tommy Hilfiger Campaign alongside Gigi Hadid. In 2016, Fox walked the runway during the Victoria's Secret Fashion Show in Paris, 2017 in Shanghai and 2018 in New York City

Lameka Fox has featured in editorials in magazines including Elle, Interview, Vogue and Teen Vogue. In March 2017, Fox featured on the cover of Harper's Bazaar Arabia and in September, she also appeared on the cover of Harper's Bazaar Vietnam, as part of a cover series alongside Shanina Shaik, Elyse Taylor, Chanel Iman, Hilary Rhoda and Tobias Sorensen.

References

External links

Year of birth missing (living people)
Living people
Female models from Maryland
African-American female models
IMG Models models
21st-century African-American people
21st-century African-American women